Mikael Krantz (born 13 September 1965) is a Swedish professional golfer.

Krantz played on the European Tour 1989–1994 where his best result was a tie for 12th in the 1993 Open de España. He played on the Challenge Tour 1991–1999 where he enjoyed success, winning four times 1991–1992, putting him on the list of golfers with most Challenge Tour wins. His best result outside Europe was a top-10 finish in the 1991 New Zealand Open at Titirangi, a PGA Tour of Australasia tournament.

Krantz played in The Open Championship three times: 1990 at St Andrews, 1993 at Royal St Georges and 1994 at Turnberry. He made the cut at Royal St Georges.

After his career Krantz moved to Germany in 2004 to become a teaching pro at Golfanlage Kirchheim-Wendlingen outside Stuttgart.

Professional wins (6)

Challenge Tour wins (4)

Swedish Golf Tour wins (2)

Team appearances
Amateur
European Boys' Team Championship (representing Sweden): 1982, 1983 (winners)
Jacques Léglise Trophy (representing the Continent of Europe): 1982, 1983

See also
List of golfers with most Challenge Tour wins

References

External links

Swedish male golfers
European Tour golfers
Sportspeople from Stuttgart
1965 births
Living people